Gilbert Allen Meche (born September 8, 1978) is a former right-handed Major League Baseball starting pitcher. Meche pitched for the Seattle Mariners for six seasons. With the Kansas City Royals, Meche made three straight Opening Day starts and was an All Star in 2007.

Early years
Meche, who is Cajun, was a star pitcher at Acadiana High School in his hometown of Lafayette, Louisiana, and was a member of the U.S. Junior Olympic team that won the gold medal in the  World Junior Baseball Championship. After his junior year of high school, Meche earned most valuable pitcher honors at the 1995 National Amateur All-Star Tournament at just sixteen years old. However, shortly afterwards, he suffered a viral infection that caused him to miss a considerable amount of playing time his senior year. Nonetheless, Meche was named to the All-America Second Team by the American Baseball Coaches Association and Rawlings. He intended to attend Louisiana State University, but reconsidered when the Seattle Mariners surprised him by selecting him in the first round of the 1996 Major League Baseball draft.

Seattle Mariners
Meche debuted with the Mariners on July 6, two months shy of his twenty-first birthday, making him the second-youngest debut for the Mariners at that time (only Ken Griffey Jr. was younger). Pitching with a 2–1 lead over the Anaheim Angels and two  outs in the sixth, Meche walked two consecutive batters to force in a run and surrender the lead. He ended up with a no-decision. His first win came on July 19 against the Arizona Diamondbacks. For the season, Meche went 8–4 with a 4.73 earned run average.

Meche lost his first four decisions of the  season. On June 13, 2000, he tossed a one-hitter against the Kansas City Royals.  After coming back to go 4–0 with a 2.64 ERA through his July 4 start against Anaheim, Meche was lifted in the sixth inning having thrown 113 pitches. His season was cut short due to what was thought at the time to be a dead arm. He went 1–2 with a 3.15 ERA in five rehab starts, but did not pitch at the major league level again for the rest of the season.

In February , Meche underwent arthroscopic surgery to partially repair a frayed rotator cuff, and at the time he was expected to only be on the disabled list for six months. As it turns out, he ended up missing the entire season, and undergoing surgery again on October 3, 2001, on his right AC joint.

Despite giving up four first inning runs, and taking the loss against the Texas Rangers, Meche came back to pitch four solid innings in which he allowed just two earned runs on solo shots by Iván Rodríguez and Juan González. From there, Meche went 15–13 with a 4.59 ERA in what was at the time far and away a career-high 186.1 innings pitched to earn the Sporting News' American League Comeback Player of the Year award.

Meche's  season got off to a slow start as his record stood at 1–5 with a 7.06 ERA following a June 1 start against the Toronto Blue Jays. He was optioned to the Pacific Coast League's Tacoma Rainiers, and returned to the M's on July 30, to go 6–2 with a 3.95 ERA in thirteen second half starts.

In 2005, Meche won 10 games despite posting an ERA of 5.09 and failing to reach 150 innings despite pitching in 26 starts. He averaged less than 6 innings in over half of his starts.

In 2006, Meche won 11 games while losing 8 in 32 starts. He struck out 156 batters in 186.2 innings.

Kansas City Royals
His record stood at 5–6 with a 3.54 ERA when he was named the Royals' sole representative at the 2007 Major League Baseball All-Star Game in San Francisco. Meche finished the season with a 9–13 record, while posting career bests in ERA (3.67), innings pitched (216) and a league-leading 34 starts.

On June 16, Meche pitched a four-hit shutout against the Diamondbacks to improve his season record to 4–5 with a 3.31 ERA. The 132 pitches he threw, however, took a toll on Meche and he began experiencing back and shoulder problems soon afterwards. For the rest of the season, Meche went just 2–5 with an 8.06 ERA.

Instead he was slated as the number-two starter behind reigning AL Cy Young Award winner Zack Greinke. Hampered by injuries again, Meche spent considerable time on the DL in 2010 and was 0–4 with a 6.66 ERA after making his final career start on May 25. After five rehab appearances with the Northwest Arkansas Naturals and Omaha Royals, Meche returned to the Royals as a reliever that September. He made eleven appearances, giving up three earned runs in thirteen innings.

Retirement

Despite a guaranteed contract that called for a $12 million salary in 2011, Meche chose to walk away from the game on January 18 as he considered it unfair for the Royals to pay him millions if he would be out all year in the last year of his contract.

In popular culture

The rock group Band of Horses, which was founded in Seattle in 2004, wrote and dedicated their song "Wicked Gil" to Meche.

References

External links
, or Retrosheet, or Pelota Binaria (Venezuelan Winter League)

1978 births
Living people
American League All-Stars
Arizona League Mariners players
Baseball players from Louisiana
Cajun sportspeople
Cardenales de Lara players
American expatriate baseball players in Venezuela
Everett AquaSox players
Kansas City Royals players
Major League Baseball pitchers
New Haven Ravens players
Northwest Arkansas Naturals players
Omaha Royals players
People from Mansfield, Texas
San Antonio Missions players
Seattle Mariners players
Sportspeople from Lafayette, Louisiana
Tacoma Rainiers players
Wisconsin Timber Rattlers players